James Brendan Foley (born April 4, 1957) is a retired American foreign service officer. He served as the United States Ambassador to the Republic of Haiti from May 27, 2003 to August 14, 2005, and as the United States Ambassador to the Republic of Croatia from August 12, 2009 to August 19, 2012.   As Ambassador to Haiti, Foley participated in the late-night negotiations between Haitian President Jean Bertrand Aristide and U.S. Secretary of State Colin L. Powell leading to Aristide's February 29, 2004 resignation and acceptance of a U.S. offer to fly him into exile.

Early life and education

Foley was born in Buffalo, New York. He received his B.A. in 1979 from the State University of New York at Fredonia and M.A.L.D. in 1984 from the Fletcher School of Law and Diplomacy.

Professional career

Foley is a former member of the Senior Foreign Service.  He served from 2007-2009 as the State Department’s Senior Coordinator for Iraqi Refugee Issues, working to alleviate the plight of several million Iraqis displaced by the war. Previously, he served as faculty member and Deputy Commandant of the National War College, as a Diplomat-in-Residence, and as Deputy Permanent Representative to the United Nations in Geneva from 2000-2003.

He joined the Foreign Service in 1983 and served overseas as vice consul and political officer in Manila, Philippines and as political officer in Algiers, Algeria.  Foley was a speechwriter and adviser to former Secretary of State Lawrence S. Eagleburger from 1989 to 1993 and Deputy Director of the Private Office of the NATO Secretary General in Brussels, Belgium from 1993 to 1996. He was special assistant to the late Senator Paul Coverdell and served as State Department Deputy Spokesman from 1997-2000.

References

External links

1957 births
Living people
Ambassadors of the United States to Haiti
State University of New York at Fredonia alumni
St. Joseph's Collegiate Institute alumni
The Fletcher School at Tufts University alumni
Ambassadors of the United States to Croatia
United States Foreign Service personnel
21st-century American diplomats